Timothy Andrew Dodds (born 28 January 1962) is a New Zealand sport shooter, who won a bronze medal representing his country at the 1990 Commonwealth Games.

Biography
Born in Gore on 28 January 1962, Dodds was educated at Gore High School.

Dodds competed for New Zealand at the 1990 Commonwealth Games in Auckland. He won a bronze medal with John Woolley in the men's skeet pair, and finished in 11th place in the men's individual skeet.

In 1990, Dodds was awarded the New Zealand 1990 Commemoration Medal. The same year he was named Southland senior sportsperson of the year.

References

1962 births
Living people
People from Gore, New Zealand
People educated at Gore High School
New Zealand male sport shooters
Commonwealth Games bronze medallists for New Zealand
Shooters at the 1990 Commonwealth Games
Commonwealth Games medallists in shooting
Medallists at the 1990 Commonwealth Games